Abūʾl-Qāsim Aḥmad ibn al-Ḥusayn ibn Qasī (died 1151) was a Sufi, a rebel leader against the Almoravid dynasty in Al-Garb Al-Andalus and governor of Silves for the Almohads. The main sources for his life are Ibn al-Abbār, Ibn al-Khaṭīb and ʿAbd al-Wāḥid al-Marrakūshī. The last is the source for his biography in the biographical dictionary of al-Ṣafadī.

He was of native Iberian stock, rūmī al-aṣl in the words of Ibn al-Abbār. He was born at Silves, but the date of his birth is unknown. His name sustains the possibility that he was a descendant of the Banu Qasi, that had once staged a rebellion against the Emirate of Cordoba.  According to Ibn al-Abbār, he was a minor government official at Silves, while Ibn al-Khaṭīb describes him as a spendthrift. He eventually sold all his goods, gave the money to the poor and became a murīd. He studied under Khalaf Allāh al-Andalusī and Ibn Khalīl in Niebla, although he may also have met Ibn al-ʿArīf in Almería. His main influences were the Encyclopedia of the Brethren of Purity (Ibn al-Abbār) and the works of al-Ghazālī (Ibn al-Khaṭīb).

See also
Muridun
Ibn Arabi
Ibn Masarra
Ibn Barrajan
Ibn al-Arif

Notes

References
Viguera, María Jesús; Los reinos de Taifas. 2007. RBA Coleccionables. 
J. Dreher, ed. and tr., Ibn Qasi, Abu l-Qasim Ahmad b. al-Husayn: Kitab Khal al-Na'Layn wa-Iqtibas al-Anwar min Mawdi al-Qadamayn (Das Imamat des islamischen Mystikers, Abulqasim Ahmad Ibn al-Husain Ibn Qasi: Eine Sudie zum Selbstverständnis des Autors des Buch vom Ausziehen der beiden Sandalen) Bonn, 1985
J. Dreher, "L'Imamat d'Ibn Qasi à Mertola (Automne 1144-été 1145); Légitimité d'Une Domination Soufie?", MIDEO 18 (1988), pp. 195–210
D. R. Goodrich, dissertation, A Sufi Revolt in Portugal: Ibn Qasi and his Kitab khal'al-na'layn, Columbia University, PH D. 1978
Nagendra Kr Singh, International encyclopaedia of Islamic dynasties, p. 34  (retrieved 1-12-2010)
William Elliot, The Career of In Qasi as Religious Teacher and Political Revolutionary in 12th Century Islamic Spain'', thesis submitted to University of Edinburgh, 1979.

Year of birth unknown
1151 deaths
12th century in Portugal
Sufis from al-Andalus
Gharb Al-Andalus
12th-century writers from al-Andalus
People from Silves, Portugal
Self-declared mahdi
Governors of the Almohad Caliphate
Muwallads